The Bellanca 14-13 Cruisair Senior and its successors were a family of light aircraft that were manufactured in the United States by AviaBellanca Aircraft after World War II.  They were a follow-up to the prewar Bellanca 14-7 and its derivatives.

Design and development

The 14-13 retained the Bellanca 14-7's basic design, but featured a redesigned fuselage structure which included an enlarged cabin, a horizontally opposed Franklin 6A4-335-B3  engine in place of the earlier models' various  engines, and an oval vertical endplate on each horizontal stabiliser.  This latter feature gained the type the affectionate nickname "cardboard Constellation", because the arrangement was similar to the contemporary Lockheed Constellation airliner.

Taking its numbering convention from the Bellanca tradition of identifying the series from the wing area in square feet, dropping the final digit, while the second number was the aircraft's horsepower, again dropping the final digit, the 14-13 had been planned to be powered by the  Franklin 6AC-298-F3 horizontal piston engine. For unknown reasons, the designation was never updated to 14-15 when a  engine  was actually used. The Bellanca 14-13 wing was constructed of wood, while the fuselage and tail were welded steel-tube framework with a fabric covering.

The  required the use of either the Koppers Aeromatic or Sensenich Skyblade propellers.

The 14-13 was introduced in 1946; in its improved 14-13-3 version the aircraft remained in production until 1949.

Model 14-19
A higher-performance design revision was granted FAA approval as the 14-19 Cruisemaster on September 26, 1949. Externally, a near-look-alike to the earlier models, this version was distinguished by its larger, oval-shaped endplates. All production ceased in 1956 as Bellanca wound up its operations.

Model 14-19-2
The 14-19 design was revived by Northern Aircraft and granted FAA approval on January 7, 1957, as the 14-19-2 Cruisemaster. The new model featured a  Continental O-470K engine, an increased gross weight of 2,700 pounds, an updated instrument panel as well as new  paint and upholstery schemes. A total of 104 of these aircraft were produced between 1957 and 1958.

The company was renamed Downer Aircraft in 1959. Inter-Air acquired the production rights in 1962 and was renamed as the Bellanca Sales Company, a subsidiary of Miller Flying Service. Further development of the design by Inter-Air resulted in the modernized Viking series introduced in 1962.

Operational history
Designed and produced in the post-World War II  era, the Bellanca 14-13 Cruisair Senior was aimed at a general aviation market. Pilot/owners were offered a combination of performance, low engine power and a modest price. Its performance and structural strength also made it attractive for utility work, but in many ways the Bellanca design was an anachronism, relying on a conventional landing gear configuration and wood-and-fabric construction that harkened back to an earlier age. Postwar economics along with a glut of surplus military aircraft precluded heavy sales although about 600 were produced.

The 14-13-2 was one of the aircraft tested by August Raspet and George Lambros of the Aerospace Department of Mississippi State College. With its propeller removed and towed behind a  Stearman, the performance of the 14-13-2 was carefully studied and reported in technical publication Research Reviews, April 1954 as "Flight Research on a Personal Type Airplane". Raspet and Lambros found the 14-13-2's maximum speed to be  and its cruise speed at 75% power to be .

In 1952, Canadian native and chiropractor Dr. Joshua Haldeman and his wife Winifred flew their 14-13-2 from Pretoria, South Africa to Oslo, Norway and back. In 1954, the Haldemans flew their 14-13-2 from South Africa to Australia and back. Over many years, the Haldemans also explored the Kalahari Desert with the 14-13-2.

Despite its introduction into a period where private aircraft sales were stagnant, the aircraft remained popular through all of its incarnations and today is considered a classic cabin monoplane and is much in demand.

The last 14-13-3 recorded in the Smithsonian archives is serial number 1648.

Variants
Cruisair Senior 14-13
Initial model introduced in 1946. Serial numbers 1060 through 1385.
Cruisair Senior 14-13-2
Improved model introduced in 1947. Featured a longer-span elevator and stabilizer with smaller end-plates, revised wood construction and revised elevator stops among others. Serial numbers 1386 through 1583.
Cruisair Senior 14-13-3
Improved model introduced in 1948. Featured dual landing lights in left wing leading edge, revised oleo struts and nut cracker, revised instrument panel and an external baggage door among others. Serial numbers 1584 and up. Remained in production until 1956
Cruisair Station Wagon 14-13W
First described in the 1948 Cruisair sales brochure. Featured plywood-lined cabin, removable rear seats and extra door on the left side of the cabin among others. Serial numbers 1584 and up.
Cruisemaster 14-19
 version introduced in 1949. Serial numbers 2000 and 2002 through 4000.
Cruisemaster 14-19-2
 version introduced in 1957. Serial numbers 4001 through 4105.
260 A 14-19-3 
 tricycle gear version introduced in 1959. Serial numbers 4106 through 4228.
260 B 14-19-3A 
Last version built by Downer Aircraft priced at $19,500 in 1962 - Powered by a 260 hp (194 kW) Continental IO-470-F engine. Serial numbers 4229 through 4342.
Downer 260C Model 14-19-3C
Version built by Inter-Air with revised empennage and 260 hp (194 kW) Continental IO-470-F engine

Specifications (14-13 Cruisair Senior)

See also

References

Notes

Bibliography

 Davisson, Budd. "We Fly the Cardboard Constellation." Air Progress Vintage Buyer's Guide, 1989.
 Mondey, David. The Complete Illustrated Encyclopedia of the World's Aircraft. Secaucus, New Jersey: Chartwell Books Inc, 1978. .
 Palmer, Trisha, ed. "Bellanca Viking Series". Encyclopedia of the World's Commercial and Private Aircraft. New York: Crescent Books, 2001. .
 "Plane and Pilot." 1978 Aircraft Directory. Santa Monica, California: Werner & Werner Corp, 1977. .
 Taylor, Michael J. H. Jane's Encyclopedia of Aviation. London: Studio Editions, 1989, p. 150. 
 World Aircraft Information Files. London: Bright Star Publishing, File 890, Sheet 24.

External links

 aerofiles.com
 National Air and Space Museum website

1940s United States civil utility aircraft
14-13
Single-engined tractor aircraft
Low-wing aircraft
Aircraft first flown in 1945